is a Japanese manga series written and illustrated by Yuji Kaku. It was serialized in Shueisha's shōnen manga magazine Weekly Shōnen Jump from November 2021 to May 2022.

Plot
 is an unusually strong boy and an avid manga fan who dreams to be a "manga hero". Repeating the special training that appears in manga that he has read since early age, Maruo became able to break rocks at the age of seven. One day, he meets , an oni ayashimon—a kind of yōkai able to shapeshift into humans—chased by an ayashimon yakuza gang. After Maruo easily defeats the gang, Urara, impressed by his strength and by the fact that he is a simple human and not an ayashimon, recruits him as the first member of her yakuza group. Maruo, hesitant at first, accepts her offer, realizing that he can experience life as a manga protagonist following the path of a yakuza.

Publication
Written and illustrated by Yuji Kaku, Ayashimon was serialized in Shueisha's shōnen manga magazine Weekly Shōnen Jump from November 15, 2021, to May 30, 2022. The first collected tankōbon volume was published on March 4, 2022.

The manga was simultaneously published in English by Viz Media and Shueisha's Manga Plus online platform.

Volume list

References

External links
 

Shōnen manga
Shueisha manga
Supernatural anime and manga
Viz Media manga
Yakuza in anime and manga
Yōkai in anime and manga